Sanjanak (also Romanized as Sanjānak; also known as Sangānak) is a village in Qarah Bagh Rural District, in the Central District of Shiraz County, Fars Province, Iran. At the 2006 census, its population was 651, in 164 families.

References 

Populated places in Shiraz County